Hiago de Oliveira Ramiro (born 20 September 1991), commonly known as Hiago, is a Brazilian footballer who plays as a forward for Inter de Limeira.

Club career
On 27 June 2013, Senica signed Hiago together with his teammate Cristovam on one-year loan with option to buy from Brazilian club Arapongas. He made his debut for Senica on 13 July 2013 against Spartak Trnava, Senica defeated Spartak Trnava 2-1.

On 19 January 2018 it was announced by Kalmar FF that they had signed Hiago for the upcoming 2018 Allsvenskan season. Hiago is the fifth Brasilian player to be signed by Kalmar since 2015, joining current squad members Romário and Nixon (on loan from Flamengo). Hiago started the first 3 games of the season on the substitute bench, being introduced each time late in the second half. In round 4 Hiago started his first full competitive match for the club against Östersunds and scored his first competitive goal for the club in the 53rd minute, to equalise at 1-1. This was the final score in the match. In the next round, Hiago again was given a start and again found the net, this time in the 61st minute against newly promoted Trelleborgs, his goal being the only one of the match and giving Kalmar their first win of the season. Continuing his hot form streak, he then started the following match against reigning Allsvenskan champions Malmö FF and in the 45th minute scored his team's third goal in an upset 3-0 home win for Kalmar.

Hiago joined CSA for the 2019 season. On 25 April 2019, he then moved to Botafogo PB. In December 2019, he signed a pre-contract with Inter de Limeira for the 2020 season.

External links
FK Senica Profile
Corgoň Liga Profile

References

1991 births
Living people
Association football forwards
Brazilian footballers
Brazilian expatriate footballers
Esporte Clube Juventude players
FC UTA Arad players
FK Senica players
Kalmar FF players
Centro Sportivo Alagoano players
Canoas Sport Club players
Londrina Esporte Clube players
Maringá Futebol Clube players
Club Sportivo Sergipe players
Fortaleza Esporte Clube players
Botafogo Futebol Clube (PB) players
Associação Atlética Internacional (Limeira) players
Slovak Super Liga players
Allsvenskan players
Campeonato Brasileiro Série C players
Campeonato Brasileiro Série D players
Expatriate footballers in Romania
Expatriate footballers in Slovakia
Expatriate footballers in Sweden
Brazilian expatriate sportspeople in Slovakia
Brazilian expatriate sportspeople in Romania
Brazilian expatriate sportspeople in Sweden
Sportspeople from Rondônia
Association football midfielders